Linda Rosenthal is an American violinist who performs internationally. She is the artistic director of a regional music festival and coaches faculty musicians through a music seminar.

Living in Juneau, Alaska since 1974 with her husband Paul Rosenthal (violinist), Rosenthal founded the Juneau Jazz & Classics music festival in 1985.  In 1995, Rosenthal and actor Bill Blush created Strings & Stories, a mix of classical music and theater commissioned by the Education Department at the Kennedy Center to introduce young people to string music.

She has been recognized for her contributions to music in Alaska with honors from the Mayor's Award for Lifetime Achievement in the Arts, Juneau Arts & Humanities Council, governor, state legislature, and University of Alaska Southeast.

References

External links
 

American classical violinists
Living people
People from Juneau, Alaska
Place of birth missing (living people)
Year of birth missing (living people)
21st-century classical violinists